The Route du Rhum is a transatlantic single-handed yacht race, which takes place every four years in November. The course is between Saint Malo, Brittany, Metropolitan France and Pointe-à-Pitre, Guadeloupe, overseas France. The first competition, won by Canadian Michael Birch in his boat Olympus Photo by a margin of 98 seconds over second-placed Michel Malinovsky in Kriter V, was held in 1978, and was marked in tragedy by the disappearance of Alain Colas during the crossing.

Current record is 6d 19h 47m 25s, set on November 16, 2022, by Charles Caudrelier.

Participation

Classes

Results

Line Honours

IMOCA 60

Multihull Ultime (Maxi)

Multihulls - ORMA 60 
Referred to as the ORMA 50, Ocean 50 and Multi 50

Multihulls - Multi 50 
Referred to as the ORMA 50, Ocean 50 and Multi 50

Class 40

References

External links
 , Official Homepage of the Route du Rhum
 , Photos of boats

Recurring sporting events established in 1978
Single-handed sailing competitions
Sailing competitions in France
Sport in Guadeloupe
Yachting races
1978 establishments in France
Transatlantic sailing competitions